Ljiljana Jorgovanović (Serbian: Љиљана Јорговановић) is a Serbian songwriter who has composed several hit albums in former Yugoslavia. She is a known collaborator with Ceca, Zdravko Čolić, Aca Lukas, Severina Vučković, Željko Joksimović and Dzej, among others. She has composed the lyrics of the Serbian entry for Eurovision Song Contest 2012, "Synonym", performed by Željko Joksimović.

Before she oriented towards folk music, she had collaborated with pop, rock and new wave artists.
However, she has had great success writing songs with her assistant Marina Tucaković.

References

Serbian composers